The General Motors A platform (informally called the A-body) was a mid-size platform designation used from 1982-1996. Previously the A body designation had been used for rear wheel drive mid-sized cars. They were initially offered alongside, but eventually supplanted rear-drive nameplates such as the Malibu for the intermediate class. Due to the strong popularity of the older rear wheel drive design, General Motors continued their production as the G-Body until 1988.

Introduced for the 1982 model year, the A-Body cars were essentially similar in mechanical layout and interior space to the troubled X-car compacts on which they were based, though longer and classified as intermediates. Initially all four lines offered two and four door sedans for 1982. In 1984, they added a wagon, replacing the rear wheel drive G-Body wagons, which were discontinued in 1983.

The A platform underpinned the Buick Century, Cutlass Ciera, Pontiac 6000 and Chevrolet Celebrity. As part of their legacy, they became enormously popular — as well as synonymous with GM's most transparent example of badge engineering: the four were highlighted almost indistinguishably on the August 22, 1983 cover of Fortune magazine as examples of genericized uniformity, embarrassing the company and ultimately prompting GM to recommit to design leadership.

Platform updates
The A-body eventually consisted of a 4-door sedan, 2-door coupé and a 4-door station wagon. 
 1982: The Chevrolet Celebrity, Pontiac 6000, Oldsmobile Cutlass Ciera and Buick Century two and four door models are introduced. 
 1983: Pontiac introduces the sporty STE variant of their 6000. Oldsmobile introduces the ES performance package for their Cutlass Ciera four door models. 
 1984: All four divisions now offered the new wagon body style. Oldsmobile introduces the Holiday Coupe package on their Cutlass Ciera Brougham coupes. 
 1985: Oldsmobile introduces an updated Cutlass Ciera with more aerodynamic front and rear styling, an updated interior and a new GT coupe model. The Oldsmobile 4.3 liter diesel engine was dropped after this model year. 
 1986: Mid year, the Oldsmobile Cutlass Ciera gets a unique roofline. The Buick Century is restyled. 
 1988: Pontiac offers all wheel drive on exclusively on their 6000 STE. All models moved to composite headlamps. Oldsmobile dropped the Brougham nameplate from their Ciera line.
 1989: the Celebrity drops its two-door models. The Cutlass Ciera, Century and 6000 receive major updates.
 1990: the Celebrity drops its four-door models, leaving only the station wagon.
 1991: The Pontiac 6000 (all models), Chevrolet Celebrity wagon and Oldsmobile Cutlass Ciera coupe are dropped.
 1992: Buick dropped the Century coupe.
 1996: For the final year of the A-Body, Oldsmobile drops the Cutlass name, simply calling their sedan the Oldsmobile Ciera.

It was updated in 1989 with a slightly longer wheelbase and a more rounded roofline (except for the Celebrity whose roofline remained unchanged as it was to be phased out in 1990). It also briefly saw duty as an all wheel drive platform for the Pontiac 6000.

Later GM platforms (specifically transaxle based, i.e. four-wheel drive and mid-engine rear-wheel drive) benefited from components and systems developed with the A-Body.  Additionally the first generation U-body minivan (1990–1996) was constructed utilizing a lightly modified version of the A-body chassis.

The A-body began to be phased out in favor of the GM W platform beginning in 1990, although production did not end for the platform until 1996 due to popularity of the remaining models.

Vehicles underpinned
 1982–1990 Chevrolet Celebrity
 1982–1991 Pontiac 6000
 1982–1995 Oldsmobile Cutlass Ciera
 1996 Oldsmobile Ciera (final year of the Cutlass Ciera and Cutlass Cruiser, sold without the "Cutlass" name)
 1982–1996 Buick Century

External links
 A-body.net - 82-96 GM A-body Website & Forum
 List of GM VIN codes

Notes

A